The Ackerl Hut is an Alpine club hut in the Wilder Kaiser mountains in Austria.

Facilities
It is a self-service hut with 15 mattresses that serves as a base for mountaineers and climbers. From June to September the Ackerl Hut is managed, at a least at weekends, otherwise it is not open and only accessible with an Alpine Club key.

Approaches 
 From Hüttling/Prama (near Going) via the Graspoint Niederalm and Schleier Waterfall in 2 hours.
 From Wochenbrunner Alm via the Gaudeamus Hut and along the Höhenweg trail in 2 hours.
 From St. Johann in Tirol along the Adlerweg trail, (here known as the Wilder Kaiser Trail (Steig)) in 3 hours.

Crossings 
 Gaudeamus Hut (1,270 m) via the Wilder Kaiser Trail, duration: 1 hour
 Fritz Pflaum Hut (1,865 m) via the Ackerlspitze, difficult, duration: 5.5 hours
 Fritz Pflaum Hut (1,865 m) over the Wilder Kaiser Trail, Gildensteig and Kleines Törl, duration: 3.5 hours
 Grutten Hut (1,620 m) over the Wilder Kaiser Trail and Jubiläumssteig, medium difficult, duration: 3 hours

Ascents 
 Maukspitze (2,231 m) in 2.5 hours
 Ackerlspitze (2,329 m) in 3 hours
 Regalmspitze (2,253 m) in 3 hours

References

External links
 Ackerl Hut on the Kaisergebirge home page 

Mountain huts in Tyrol (state)
Kaiser Mountains
Kitzbühel District
Kitzbühel